The Importance of Being Earnest, A Trivial Comedy for Serious People is a play by Oscar Wilde. First performed on 14 February 1895 at the St James's Theatre in London, it is a farcical comedy in which the protagonists maintain fictitious personae to escape burdensome social obligations. Working within the social conventions of late Victorian London, the play's major themes are the triviality with which it treats institutions as serious as marriage and the resulting satire of Victorian ways. Some contemporary reviews praised the play's humour and the culmination of Wilde's artistic career, while others were cautious about its lack of social messages. Its high farce and witty dialogue have helped make The Importance of Being Earnest Wilde's most enduringly popular play.

The successful opening night marked the climax of Wilde's career but also heralded his downfall. The Marquess of Queensberry, whose son Lord Alfred Douglas was Wilde's lover, planned to present the writer with a bouquet of rotten vegetables and disrupt the show. Wilde was tipped off, and Queensberry was refused admission. Their feud came to a climax in court when Wilde sued for libel. The proceedings provided enough evidence for his arrest, trial, and conviction on charges of gross indecency. Wilde's homosexuality was revealed to the Victorian public, and he was sentenced to two years imprisonment with hard labour. Despite the play's early success, Wilde's notoriety caused the play to be closed after 86 performances. After his release from prison, he published the play from exile in Paris, but he wrote no more comic or dramatic works.

The Importance of Being Earnest has been revived many times since its premiere. It has been adapted for the cinema on three occasions. In a 1952 film Edith Evans reprised her stage interpretation of Lady Bracknell; a 1992 version directed by Kurt Baker used an all-black cast; and Oliver Parker's 2002 film incorporated some of Wilde's original material cut during the preparation of the first stage production.

Composition

The play was written following the success of Wilde's earlier plays Lady Windermere's Fan, An Ideal Husband and A Woman of No Importance. He spent the summer of 1894 with his family at Worthing, where he began work on the new play. His fame now at its peak, he used the working title Lady Lancing to avoid preemptive speculation about its content. Many names and ideas in the play were borrowed from people or places the author had known; Lady Queensberry, Lord Alfred Douglas's mother, for example, lived at Bracknell. Wilde scholars agree the most important influence on the play was W. S. Gilbert's 1877 farce Engaged, from which Wilde borrowed not only several incidents but also "the gravity of tone demanded by Gilbert of his actors".

Wilde continually revised the text over the next months. No line was left untouched, and the revision had significant consequences. Sos Eltis describes Wilde's revisions as a refined art at work. The earliest and longest handwritten drafts of the play labour over farcical incidents, broad puns, nonsense dialogue, and conventional comic turns. In revising, "Wilde transformed standard nonsense into the more systemic and disconcerting illogicality which characterises Earnest's dialogue". Richard Ellmann argues Wilde had reached his artistic maturity and wrote more surely and rapidly.

Wilde wrote the part of Jack Worthing with the actor-manager Charles Wyndham in mind. Wilde shared Bernard Shaw's view that Wyndham was the ideal comedy actor and based the character on his stage persona. Wyndham accepted the play for production at his theatre, but before rehearsals began, he changed his plans to help a colleague in a crisis. In early 1895, at the St James's Theatre, the actor-manager George Alexander's production of Henry James's Guy Domville failed, and closed after 31 performances, leaving Alexander in urgent need of a new play to follow it. Wyndham waived his contractual rights and allowed Alexander to stage Wilde's play.

After working with Wilde on stage movements with a toy theatre, Alexander asked the author to shorten the play from four acts to three. Wilde agreed and combined elements of the second and third acts. The largest cut was the removal of the character of Mr. Gribsby, a solicitor who comes from London to arrest the profligate "Ernest" (i.e., Jack) for unpaid dining bills. The four-act version was first played on a BBC radio production and is still sometimes performed. Some consider the three-act structure more effective and theatrically resonant than the expanded published edition.

Productions

Premiere
The play was first produced at the St James's Theatre on Valentine's Day 1895. It was freezing cold, but Wilde arrived dressed in "florid sobriety", wearing a green carnation. The audience, according to one report, "included many members of the great and good, former cabinet ministers and privy councillors, as well as actors, writers, academics, and enthusiasts". Allan Aynesworth, who played Algernon Moncrieff, recalled to Hesketh Pearson that "In my fifty-three years of acting, I never remember a greater triumph than [that] first night". Aynesworth was himself "debonair and stylish", and Alexander, who played Jack Worthing, "demure".

The cast was:

John Worthing, J.P. – George Alexander
Algernon Moncrieff – Allan Aynesworth
Rev. Canon Chasuble, D.D. – H. H. Vincent
Merriman – Frank Dyall
Lane – F. Kinsey Peile

Lady Bracknell – Rose Leclercq
Hon. Gwendolen Fairfax – Irene Vanbrugh
Cecily Cardew – Evelyn Millard
Miss Prism – Mrs. George Canninge

The Marquess of Queensberry, the father of Wilde's lover Lord Alfred Douglas (who was on holiday in Algiers at the time), had planned to disrupt the play by throwing a bouquet of rotten vegetables at the playwright when he took his bow at the end of the show. Wilde and Alexander learned of the plan, and the latter cancelled Queensberry's ticket and arranged for policemen to bar his entrance. Nevertheless, he continued harassing Wilde, who eventually launched a private prosecution against the peer for criminal libel, triggering a series of trials ending in Wilde's imprisonment for gross indecency. Alexander tried, unsuccessfully, to save the production by removing Wilde's name from the billing,, but the play had to close after only 86 performances.

The play's original Broadway production opened at the Empire Theatre on 22 April 1895 but closed after sixteen performances. Its cast included William Faversham as Algy, Henry Miller as Jack, Viola Allen as Gwendolen, and Ida Vernon as Lady Bracknell. The Australian premiere was in Melbourne on 10 August 1895, presented by Dion Boucicault Jr. and Robert Brough, and the play was an immediate success. Wilde's downfall in England did not affect the popularity of his plays in Australia.

Critical reception

In contrast to much theatre of the time, the light plot of The Importance of Being Earnest does not seem to tackle serious social and political issues, something contemporary reviewers were wary of. Though unsure of Wilde's seriousness as a dramatist, they recognised the play's cleverness, humour, and popularity with audiences. Shaw, for example, reviewed the play in the Saturday Review, arguing that comedy should touch as well as amuse, "I go to the theatre to be moved to laughter." Later in a letter, he said the play, though "extremely funny", was Wilde's "first really heartless [one]". In The World, William Archer wrote that he had enjoyed watching the play but found it to be empty of meaning: "What can a poor critic do with a play which raises no principle, whether of art or morals, creates its own canons and conventions, and is nothing but an absolutely wilful expression of an irrepressibly witty personality?"

In The Speaker, A. B. Walkley admired the play and was one of few to see it as the culmination of Wilde's dramatic career. He denied the term "farce" was derogatory or even lacking in seriousness and said, "It is of nonsense all compact, and better nonsense, I think, our stage has not seen." H. G. Wells, in an unsigned review for The Pall Mall Gazette, called Earnest one of the freshest comedies of the year, saying, "More humorous dealing with theatrical conventions it would be difficult to imagine." He also questioned whether people would fully see its message, "... how Serious People will take this Trivial Comedy intended for their learning remains to be seen. No doubt seriously." The play was so light-hearted that many reviewers compared it to comic opera rather than drama. W. H. Auden later (1963) called it "a pure verbal opera", and The Times commented, "The story is almost too preposterous to go without music." Mary McCarthy, in Sights and Spectacles (1959), however, and despite thinking the play extremely funny, called it "a ferocious idyll"; "depravity is the hero and the only character."

The Importance of Being Earnest is Wilde's most popular work and is continually revived. Max Beerbohm called the play Wilde's "finest, most undeniably his own", saying that in his other comedies – Lady Windermere's Fan, A Woman of No Importance and An Ideal Husband – the plot, following the manner of Victorien Sardou, is unrelated to the theme of the work, while in Earnest the story is "dissolved" into the form of the play.

Revivals
The Importance of Being Earnest and Wilde's three other society plays were performed in Britain during the author's imprisonment and exile, albeit by small touring companies. A. B. Tapping's company toured Earnest between October 1895 and March 1899 (their performance at the Theatre Royal, Limerick, in the last week of October 1895 was almost certainly the play's first production in Ireland). Elsie Lanham's company also toured 'Earnest' between November 1899 and April 1900. Alexander revived Earnest in a small theatre in Notting Hill, outside the West End, in 1901; in the same year he presented the piece on tour, playing Jack Worthing with a cast including the young Lilian Braithwaite as Cecily. The play returned to the West End when Alexander presented a revival at the St James's in 1902. Broadway revivals were mounted in 1902 and again in 1910, each production running for six weeks.

A collected edition of Wilde's works, published in 1908 and edited by Robert Ross, helped to restore his reputation as an author. Alexander presented another revival of Earnest at the St James's in 1909, when he and Aynesworth reprised their original roles; the revival ran for 316 performances. Max Beerbohm said that the play was sure to become a classic of the English repertory and that its humour was as fresh then as when it had been written, adding that the actors had "worn as well as the play".

For a 1913 revival at the same theatre, the young actors Gerald Ames and A. E. Matthews succeeded the creators as Jack and Algy. Leslie Faber as Jack, John Deverell as Algy and Margaret Scudamore as Lady Bracknell headed the cast in a 1923 production at the Haymarket Theatre. Many revivals in the first decades of the 20th century treated "the present" as the current year. It was not until the 1920s that the case for 1890s costumes was established; as a critic in The Manchester Guardian put it, "Thirty years on, one begins to feel that Wilde should be done in the costume of his period – that his wit today needs the backing of the atmosphere that gave it life and truth. … Wilde's glittering and complex verbal felicities go ill with the shingle and the short skirt."

In Sir Nigel Playfair's 1930 production at the Lyric, Hammersmith, John Gielgud played Jack to the Lady Bracknell of his aunt, Mabel Terry-Lewis. Gielgud produced and starred in a production at the Globe (now the Gielgud) Theatre in 1939, in a cast that included Edith Evans as Lady Bracknell, Joyce Carey as Gwendolen, Angela Baddeley as Cecily and Margaret Rutherford as Miss Prism. The Times considered the production the best since the original and praised it for its fidelity to Wilde's conception and its "airy, responsive ball-playing quality." Later in the same year, Gielgud presented the work again, with Jack Hawkins as Algy, Gwen Ffrangcon-Davies as Gwendolen and Peggy Ashcroft as Cecily, with Evans and Rutherford in their previous roles. The production was presented in several seasons during and after the Second World War, with mostly the same main players. During a 1946 season at the Haymarket, the King and Queen attended a performance, which, as the journalist Geoffrey Wheatcroft put it, gave the play "a final accolade of respectability." The production toured North America and was successfully staged on Broadway in 1947.

As Wilde's work came to be read and performed again, it was The Importance of Being Earnest that received the most productions. By the time of its centenary, the journalist Mark Lawson described it as "the second most known and quoted play in English after Hamlet."

For Sir Peter Hall's 1982 production at the National Theatre, the cast included Judi Dench as Lady Bracknell, Martin Jarvis as Jack, Nigel Havers as Algy, Zoë Wanamaker as Gwendolen and Anna Massey as Miss Prism. Nicholas Hytner's 1993 production at the Aldwych Theatre, starring Maggie Smith, had occasional references to the supposed gay subtext.

In 2005 the Abbey Theatre, Dublin, produced the play with an all-male cast; it also featured Wilde as a character – the play opens with him drinking in a Parisian café, dreaming of his play. The Melbourne Theatre Company staged production in December 2011 with Geoffrey Rush as Lady Bracknell.

In 2007 Theatre Royal, Bath produced the play with Peter Gill directing. Penelope Keith played Lady Bracknell, Harry Hadden-Paton played Jack, William Ellis played Algernon, Gwendolen was played by Daisy Haggard and Cecily was played by Rebecca Night. The production went on a short UK Tour before playing in the West End of London at Vaudeville Theatre in 2008 and received positive reviews.

In 2011 the Roundabout Theatre Company produced a Broadway revival based on the 2009 Stratford Shakespeare Festival production featuring Brian Bedford as director and as Lady Bracknell. It opened at the American Airlines Theatre on 13 January and ran until 3 July 2011. The cast also included Dana Ivey as Miss Prism, Paxton Whitehead as Canon Chasuble, Santino Fontana as Algernon, Paul O'Brien as Lane, Charlotte Parry as Cecily, David Furr as Jack and Sara Topham as Gwendolen. It was nominated for three Tony Awards.

The play was also presented internationally, in Singapore, in October 2004, by the British Theatre Playhouse, and the same company brought it to London's Greenwich Theatre in April 2005.

A 2018 revival was directed by Michael Fentiman for the Vaudeville Theatre, London, as part of a season of four Wilde plays produced by Dominic Dromgoole. The production received largely negative press reviews.

In 2021, during the Covid-19 pandemic, a group of students from Newcastle University filmed a production, including scenes with Wilde himself as a character, at the Sunderland Empire to raise awareness of struggling theatres and artists who had suffered from negative implications of lockdowns in the UK. The production received largely positive press for its message.

Synopsis
The play is set in "The Present" (i.e., 1895).

Act I: Algernon Moncrieff's flat in Half Moon Street, W
The play opens with Algernon Moncrieff, an idle young gentleman, receiving his best friend, Jack Worthing ("Ernest"). Ernest has come from the country to propose to Algernon's cousin, Gwendolen Fairfax. Algernon refuses to consent until Ernest explains why his cigarette case bears the inscription, "From little Cecily, with her fondest love to her dear Uncle Jack." 'Ernest' is forced to admit to living a double life. In the country, he assumes a serious attitude for the benefit of his young ward, the heiress Cecily Cardew, and goes by the name of Jack while pretending that he must worry about a wastrel younger brother named Ernest in London. Meanwhile, he assumes the identity of the libertine Ernest in the city. Algernon confesses a similar deception: he pretends to have an invalid friend named Bunbury in the country, whom he can "visit" whenever he wishes to avoid an unwelcome social obligation. Jack refuses to tell Algernon the location of his country estate.

Gwendolen and her formidable mother, Lady Bracknell, now call on Algernon, who distracts Lady Bracknell in another room while Jack proposes to Gwendolen. She accepts but seems to love him in large part because of his name, Ernest. Jack accordingly resolves to himself to be rechristened "Ernest". Discovering them in this intimate exchange, Lady Bracknell interviews Jack as a prospective suitor. Horrified to learn that he was adopted after being discovered as a baby in a handbag at Victoria Station, she refuses him and forbids further contact with her daughter. Gwendolen manages to covertly promise to him her undying love. As Jack gives her his address in the country, Algernon surreptitiously notes it on the cuff of his sleeve: Jack's revelation of his pretty and wealthy young ward has motivated his friend to meet her.

Act II: The Garden of the Manor House, Woolton
Cecily is studying with her governess, Miss Prism. Algernon arrives, pretending to be Ernest Worthing, and soon charms Cecily. Long fascinated by Uncle Jack's hitherto absent black sheep brother, she is predisposed to fall for Algernon in his role of Ernest (a name she is apparently particularly fond of). Therefore, Algernon, too, plans for the rector, Dr. Chasuble, to rechristen him "Ernest". Jack has decided to abandon his double life. He arrives in full mourning and announces his brother's death in Paris with a severe chill, a story undermined by Algernon's presence in the guise of Ernest. Gwendolen now enters, having run away from home. During the temporary absence of the two men, she meets Cecily, each woman indignantly declaring that she is the one engaged to "Ernest". When Jack and Algernon reappear, their deceptions are exposed.

Act III: Morning-Room at the Manor House, Woolton
Arriving in pursuit of her daughter, Lady Bracknell is astonished to be told that Algernon and Cecily are engaged. The revelation of Cecily's wealth soon dispels Lady Bracknell's initial doubts over the young lady's suitability, but any engagement is forbidden by her guardian Jack: he will consent only if Lady Bracknell agrees to his own union with Gwendolen – something she declines to do.

The impasse is broken by the return of Miss Prism, whom Lady Bracknell recognises as the person who, 28 years earlier as a family nursemaid, had taken a baby boy for a walk in a perambulator and never returned. Challenged, Miss Prism explains that she had absent-mindedly put the manuscript of a novel she was writing in the perambulator and the baby in a handbag, which she had left at Victoria Station. Jack produces the same handbag, showing that he is the lost baby, the elder son of Lady Bracknell's late sister, and thus Algernon's elder brother. Having acquired such respectable relations, he is acceptable as Gwendolen's suitor.

Gwendolen, however, insists she can love only a man named Ernest. Lady Bracknell informs Jack that, as the firstborn, he would have been named after his father, General Moncrieff. Jack examines the army lists and discovers that his father's name – and hence his own real name – was, in fact, Ernest. Pretence was reality all along. As the happy couples embrace – Jack and Gwendolen, Algernon and Cecily, and even Dr. Chasuble and Miss Prism – Lady Bracknell complains to her newfound relative: "My nephew, you seem to be displaying signs of triviality." "On the contrary, Aunt Augusta", he replies, "I've now realised for the first time in my life the vital importance of being Earnest."

Characters
Jack Worthing (Ernest), a young gentleman from the country, in love with Gwendolen Fairfax.
Algernon Moncrieff, a young gentleman from London, the nephew of Lady Bracknell, in love with Cecily Cardew.
Gwendolen Fairfax, a young lady, loved by Jack Worthing.
Lady Augusta Bracknell, a society lady, Gwendolen's mother.
Cecily Cardew, a young lady, the ward of Jack Worthing.
Miss Prism, Cecily's governess.
The Reverend Canon Chasuble, the priest of Jack's parish.
Lane, Algernon's manservant.
Merriman, the butler of Jack's country house.

Themes

Triviality
Arthur Ransome described The Importance... as the most trivial of Wilde's society plays and the only one that produces "that peculiar exhilaration of the spirit by which we recognise the beautiful." "It is", he wrote, "precisely because it is consistently trivial that it is not ugly." Ellmann says that The Importance of Being Earnest touched on many themes Wilde had been building since the 1880s – the languor of aesthetic poses was well established, and Wilde takes it as a starting point for the two protagonists. While Salome, An Ideal Husband and The Picture of Dorian Gray had dwelt on more serious wrongdoing, vice in Earnest is represented by Algy's craving for cucumber sandwiches. Wilde told Robert Ross that the play's theme was "That we should treat all trivial things in life very seriously, and all serious things of life with a sincere and studied triviality." The theme is hinted at in the play's ironic title, and "earnestness" is repeatedly alluded to in the dialogue; Algernon says in Act II, "one has to be serious about something if one is to have any amusement in life", but goes on to reproach Jack for 'being serious about everything'". Blackmail and corruption had haunted the double lives of Dorian Gray and Sir Robert Chiltern (in An Ideal Husband), but in Earnest the protagonists' duplicity (Algernon's "bunburying" and Worthing's double life as Jack and Ernest) is undertaken for more innocent purposes – largely to avoid unwelcome social obligations. While much theatre of the time tackled serious social and political issues, Earnest is superficially about nothing at all. It "refuses to play the game" of other period dramatists, for instance, Bernard Shaw, who used their characters to draw audiences to grander ideals.

As a satire of society
The play repeatedly mocks Victorian traditions and social customs, marriage and the pursuit of love in particular. In Victorian times earnestness was considered to be the overriding societal value; originating in religious attempts to reform the lower classes, it spread to the upper ones too throughout the century. The play's very title, with its mocking paradox (serious people are so because they do not see trivial comedies), introduces the theme; it continues in the drawing room discussion, "Yes, but you must be serious about it. I hate people who are not serious about meals. It is so shallow of them," says Algernon in Act 1; allusions are quick and from multiple angles.

The men follow traditional matrimonial rites, whereby suitors admit their weaknesses to their prospective brides, but the foibles they excuse are ridiculous, and the farce is built on an absurd confusion of a book and a baby. When Jack apologises to Gwendolen during his marriage proposal, it is for not being wicked:
JACK: Gwendolen, it is a terrible thing for a man to find out suddenly that all his life he has been speaking nothing but the truth. Can you forgive me?

GWENDOLEN: I can. For I feel that you are sure to change. 
In turn, Gwendolen and Cecily have the idea of marrying a man named Ernest, a popular and respected name at the time. Gwendolen, quite unlike her mother's methodical analysis of Jack Worthing's suitability as a husband, places her entire faith in a Christian name, declaring in Act I, "The only really safe name is Ernest". This is an opinion shared by Cecily in Act II, "I pity any poor married woman whose husband is not called Ernest". They indignantly declare that they have been deceived when they discover the men's real names.

Wilde embodied society's rules and rituals artfully into Lady Bracknell: minute attention to the details of her style created a comic effect of assertion by restraint. In contrast to her encyclopaedic knowledge of the social distinctions of London's street names, Jack's obscure parentage is subtly evoked. He defends himself against her, "A handbag?" with the clarification, "The Brighton Line". At the time, Victoria Station consisted of two separate but adjacent terminal stations sharing the same name. To the east was the ramshackle LC&D Railway, on the west the up-market LB&SCR – the Brighton Line, which went to Worthing, the fashionable, expensive town the gentleman who found baby Jack was travelling to at the time (and after which Jack was named).

Suggested homosexual subtext
Queer scholars have argued that the play's themes of duplicity and ambivalence are inextricably bound up with Wilde's homosexuality and that the play exhibits a "flickering presence-absence of... homosexual desire". On re-reading the play after his release from prison, Wilde said: "It was extraordinary reading the play over. How I used to toy with that Tiger Life."

It has been said that the use of the name Earnest may have been a homosexual in-joke. In 1892, three years before Wilde wrote the play, John Gambril Nicholson had published the book of pederastic poetry Love in Earnest. The sonnet Of Boys' Names included the verse: "Though Frank may ring like silver bell / And Cecil softer music claim / They cannot work the miracle / –'Tis Ernest sets my heart a-flame." The word "earnest" may also have been a code-word for homosexual, as in: "Is he earnest?" in the same way that "Is he so?" and "Is he musical?" were employed. Sir Donald Sinden, an actor who had met two of the play's original cast (Irene Vanbrugh and Allan Aynesworth) and Lord Alfred Douglas, wrote to The Times to dispute suggestions that "Earnest" held any sexual connotations:
Although they had ample opportunity, at no time did any of them even hint that "Earnest" was a synonym for homosexual or that "bunburying" may have implied homosexual sex. The first time I heard it mentioned was in the 1980s, and I immediately consulted Sir John Gielgud, whose own performance of Jack Worthing in the same play was legendary and whose knowledge of theatrical lore was encyclopaedic. He replied in his ringing tones: "No-No! Nonsense, absolute nonsense: I would have known".

Several theories have also been put forward to explain the derivation of Bunbury, and Bunburying, which is used in the play to imply a secretive double life. It may have derived from Henry Shirley Bunbury, a hypochondriacal acquaintance of Wilde's youth. Another suggestion, put forward in 1913 by Aleister Crowley, who knew Wilde, was that Bunbury was a combination word: that Wilde had once taken a train to Banbury, met a schoolboy there, and arranged a second secret meeting with him at Sunbury.

Bunburying
Bunburying is a stratagem used by people who need an excuse to avoid social obligations in their daily lives. The word "bunburying" first appears in Act I when Algernon explains that he invented a fictional friend, a chronic invalid named "Bunbury", to have an excuse for getting out of events he does not wish to attend, particularly with his Aunt Augusta (Lady Bracknell). Algernon and Jack both use this method to secretly visit their lovers, Cecily and Gwendolen.

Dramatic analysis

Use of language
While Wilde had long been famous for dialogue and his use of language, Raby (1988) argues that he achieved unity and mastery in Earnest that was unmatched in his other plays, except perhaps Salomé. While his earlier comedies suffer from an unevenness resulting from the thematic clash between the trivial and the serious, Earnest achieves a pitch-perfect style that allows these to dissolve. There are three different registers detectable in the play. The dandyish insouciance of Jack and Algernon – established early with Algernon's exchange with his manservant – betrays an underlying unity despite their differing attitudes. The formidable pronouncements of Lady Bracknell are as startling for her use of hyperbole and rhetorical extravagance as for her disconcerting opinions. In contrast, the speech of Dr. Chasuble and Miss Prism is distinguished by "pedantic precept" and "idiosyncratic diversion". Furthermore, the play is full of epigrams and paradoxes. Max Beerbohm described it as littered with "chiselled apophthegms – witticisms unrelated to action or character", of which he found half a dozen to be of the highest order.

Lady Bracknell's line, "A handbag?", has been called one of the most malleable in English drama, lending itself to interpretations ranging from incredulous or scandalised to baffled. Edith Evans, both on stage and in the 1952 film, delivered the line loudly in a mixture of horror, incredulity, and condescension. Stockard Channing, in the Gaiety Theatre, Dublin in 2010, hushed the line, in a critic's words, "with a barely audible 'A handbag?', rapidly swallowed up with a sharp intake of breath. An understated take, to be sure, but with such a well-known play, packed full of witticisms and aphorisms with a life of their own, it's the little things that make a difference."

Characterisation
Though Wilde deployed characters that were by now familiar – the dandy lord, the overbearing matriarch, the woman with a past, the puritan young lady – his treatment is subtler than in his earlier comedies. Lady Bracknell, for instance, embodies respectable, upper-class society, but Eltis notes how her development "from the familiar overbearing duchess into a quirkier and more disturbing character" can be traced through Wilde's revisions of the play. For the two young men, Wilde presents not stereotypical stage "dudes" but intelligent beings who, as Jackson puts it, "speak like their creator in well-formed complete sentences and rarely use slang or vogue-words". Dr. Chasuble and Miss Prism are characterised by a few light touches of detail, their old-fashioned enthusiasms, and the Canon's fastidious pedantry, pared down by Wilde during his many redrafts of the text.

Structure and genre
Ransome argues that Wilde freed himself by abandoning the melodrama, the basic structure which underlies his earlier social comedies and basing the story entirely on the Earnest/Ernest verbal conceit. Freed from "living up to any drama more serious than conversation, " Wilde could now amuse himself to a fuller extent with quips, epigrams, and repartee that really had little to do with the business at hand.

The genre of the Importance of Being Earnest has been intensely debated by scholars and critics alike, who have placed the play within a wide variety of genres ranging from parody to satire. In his critique of Wilde, Foster argues that the play creates a world where "real values are inverted [and], reason and unreason are interchanged". Similarly, Wilde's use of dialogue mocks the upper classes of Victorian England lending the play a satirical tone. Reinhart further stipulates that the use of farcical humour to mock the upper classes "merits the play both as satire and as drama".

Publication

First edition

Wilde's two final comedies, An Ideal Husband and The Importance of Being Earnest, were still on stage in London at the time of his prosecution, and they were soon closed as the details of his case became public. After two years in prison with hard labour, Wilde went into exile in Paris, sick and depressed, his reputation destroyed in England. In 1898, when no one else would, Leonard Smithers agreed with Wilde to publish the two final plays. Wilde proved to be a diligent reviser, sending detailed instructions on stage directions, character listings, and the book's presentation and insisting that a playbill from the first performance be reproduced inside. Ellmann argues that the proofs show a man "very much in command of himself and of the play". Wilde's name did not appear on the cover, it was "By the Author of Lady Windermere's Fan". His return to work was brief though, as he refused to write anything else, "I can write, but have lost the joy of writing".
On 19 October 2007, a first edition (number 349 of 1,000) was discovered inside a handbag in an Oxfam shop in Nantwich, Cheshire. The staff was unable to trace the donor. It was sold for £650.

In translation
The Importance of Being Earnests popularity has meant it has been translated into many languages, though the homophonous pun in the title ("Ernest", a masculine proper name, and "earnest", the virtue of steadfastness and seriousness) poses a special problem for translators. The easiest case of a suitable translation of the pun, perpetuating its sense and meaning, may have been its translation into German. Since English and German are closely related languages, German provides an equivalent adjective ("ernst") and also a matching masculine proper name ("Ernst"). The meaning and tenor of the wordplay are exactly the same. Yet there are many different possible titles in German, mostly concerning sentence structure. The two most common ones are "Bunbury oder ernst / Ernst sein ist alles" and "Bunbury oder wie wichtig es ist, ernst / Ernst zu sein". In a study of Italian translations, Adrian Pablé found thirteen different versions using eight titles. Since wordplay is often unique to the language in question, translators are faced with a choice of either staying faithful to the original – in this case, the English adjective and virtue earnest – or creating a similar pun in their own language.

Translators have used four main strategies. The first leaves all characters' names unchanged and in their original spelling: thus, the name is respected, and readers are reminded of the original cultural setting, but the liveliness of the pun is lost. Eva Malagoli varied this source-oriented approach by using both the English Christian names and the adjective earnest, thus preserving the pun and the English character of the play, but possibly straining an Italian reader. A third group of translators replaced Ernest with a name that also represents a virtue in the target language, favouring transparency for readers in translation over fidelity to the original. For instance, in Italian, these versions variously call the play L'importanza di essere Franco/Severo/Fedele, the given names being respectively the values of honesty, propriety, and loyalty. French offers a closer pun: "Constant" is both a first name and the quality of steadfastness, so the play is commonly known as De l'importance d'être Constant, though Jean Anouilh translated the play under the title: Il est important d'être Aimé ("Aimé" is a name which also means "beloved"). These translators differ in their attitude to the original English honorific titles, some change them all or none, but most leave a mix partially as a compensation for the added loss of Englishness. Lastly, one translation gave the name an Italianate touch by rendering it as Ernesto; this work liberally mixed proper nouns from both languages.

Adaptations

Film

Apart from several "made-for-television" versions, The Importance of Being Earnest has been adapted for the English-language cinema at least three times, first in 1952 by Anthony Asquith who adapted the screenplay and directed it. Michael Denison (Algernon), Michael Redgrave (Jack), Edith Evans (Lady Bracknell), Dorothy Tutin (Cecily), Joan Greenwood (Gwendolen), and Margaret Rutherford (Miss Prism) and Miles Malleson (Canon Chasuble) were among the cast. In 1992 Kurt Baker directed a version using an all-black cast with Daryl Keith Roach as Jack, Wren T. Brown as Algernon, Ann Weldon as Lady Bracknell, Lanei Chapman as Cecily, Chris Calloway as Gwendolen, CCH Pounder as Miss Prism, and Brock Peters as Doctor Chasuble, set in the United States.
Oliver Parker, a director who had previously adapted An Ideal Husband by Wilde, made the 2002 film; it stars Colin Firth (Jack), Rupert Everett (Algy), Judi Dench (Lady Bracknell), Reese Witherspoon (Cecily), Frances O'Connor (Gwendolen), Anna Massey (Miss Prism), and Tom Wilkinson (Canon Chasuble). Parker's adaptation includes the dunning solicitor Mr. Gribsby who pursues "Ernest" to Hertfordshire (present in Wilde's original draft, but cut at the behest of the play's first producer). Algernon too is pursued by a group of creditors in the opening scene.

A 2008 Telugu language romantic comedy film, titled Ashta Chamma, is an adaptation of the play.

Operas and musicals
In 1960, Ernest in Love was staged Off-Broadway. The Japanese all-female musical theatre troupe Takarazuka Revue staged this musical in 2005 in two productions, one by Moon Troupe and the other one by Flower Troupe.

In 1963, Erik Chisholm composed an opera from the play, using Wilde's text as the libretto.

In 1964, Gerd Natschinski composed the musical Mein Freund Bunbury based on the play, 1964 premiered at Metropol Theater Berlin.

According to a study by Robert Tanitch, by 2002, there had been at least eight adaptations of the play as a musical, though "never with conspicuous success". The earliest such version was a 1927 American show entitled Oh Earnest. The journalist Mark Bostridge comments, "The libretto of a 1957 musical adaptation, Half in Earnest, deposited in the British Library, is scarcely more encouraging. The curtain rises on Algy, strumming away at the piano, singing, 'I can play Chopsticks, Lane'. Other songs include 'A Bunburying I Must Go'."

Gerald Barry created the 2011 opera, The Importance of Being Earnest, commissioned by the Los Angeles Philharmonic and the Barbican Centre in London. It premiered in Los Angeles in 2011. The stage premiere was given by the Opéra national de Lorraine in Nancy, France in 2013.

In 2017, Odyssey Opera of Boston presented a fully staged production of Mario Castelnuovo-Tedesco's opera The Importance of Being Earnest as part of their Wilde Opera Nights series, which was a season-long exploration of operatic works inspired by the writings and world of Oscar Wilde. The opera for two pianos, percussion, and singers was composed in 1961-2. It is filled with musical quotes at every turn. The opera was never published, but it was performed twice: the premiere in Monte Carlo (1972 in Italian) and La Guardia, NY (1975). Odyssey Opera was able to obtain the manuscript from the Library of Congress with the permission of the composer's granddaughter. After Odyssey's production at the Wimberly Theatre, Calderwood Pavilion at the Boston Center for the Arts on 17 and 18 March, being received with critical acclaim, The Boston Globe stated "Odyssey Opera recognizes 'The Importance of Being Earnest.'"

Stage pastiche
In 2016 Irish actor/writers Helen Norton and Jonathan White wrote the comic play To Hell in a Handbag which retells the story of Importance from the point of view of the characters Canon Chasuble and Miss Prism, giving them their own back story and showing what happens to them when they are not on stage in Wilde's play.

Radio and television
There have been many radio versions of the play. In 1925 the BBC broadcast an adaptation with Hesketh Pearson as Jack Worthing. Further broadcasts of the play followed in 1927 and 1936. In 1977, BBC Radio 4 broadcast the four-act version of the play, with Fabia Drake as Lady Bracknell, Richard Pasco as Jack, Jeremy Clyde as Algy, Maurice Denham as Canon Chasuble, Sylvia Coleridge as Miss Prism, Barbara Leigh-Hunt as Gwendolen and Prunella Scales as Cecily. The production was later released on CD.

To commemorate the centenary of the first performance of the play, Radio 4 broadcast a new adaptation on 13 February 1995; directed by Glyn Dearman, it featured Judi Dench as Lady Bracknell, Michael Hordern as Lane, Michael Sheen as Jack Worthing, Martin Clunes as Algernon Moncrieff, John Moffatt as Canon Chasuble, Miriam Margolyes as Miss Prism, Samantha Bond as Gwendolen and Amanda Root as Cecily. The production was later issued on an audio cassette.

On 13 December 2000, BBC Radio 3 broadcast a new adaptation directed by Howard Davies starring Geraldine McEwan as Lady Bracknell, Simon Russell Beale as Jack Worthing, Julian Wadham as Algernon Moncrieff, Geoffrey Palmer as Canon Chasuble, Celia Imrie as Miss Prism, Victoria Hamilton as Gwendolen and Emma Fielding as Cecily, with music composed by Dominic Muldowney. The production was released on an audio cassette.

A 1964 commercial television adaptation starred Ian Carmichael, Patrick Macnee, Susannah York, Fenella Fielding, Pamela Brown and Irene Handl.

BBC television transmissions of the play have included a 1974 Play of the Month version starring Coral Browne as Lady Bracknell with Michael Jayston, Julian Holloway, Gemma Jones and Celia Bannerman. Stuart Burge directed another adaptation in 1986 with a cast including Gemma Jones, Alec McCowen, Paul McGann and Joan Plowright.

It was adapted for Australian TV in 1957.

Commercial recordings
Gielgud's performance is preserved on an EMI audio recording dating from 1952, which also captures Edith Evans's, Lady Bracknell. The cast also includes Roland Culver (Algy), Jean Cadell (Miss Prism), Pamela Brown (Gwendolen), and Celia Johnson (Cecily).

Other audio recordings include a "Theatre Masterworks" version from 1953, directed and narrated by Margaret Webster, with a cast including Maurice Evans, Lucile Watson and Mildred Natwick; a 1989 version by California Artists Radio Theatre, featuring Dan O'Herlihy Jeanette Nolan, Les Tremayne and Richard Erdman; and one by L.A. Theatre Works issued in 2009, featuring Charles Busch, James Marsters and Andrea Bowen.

Notes

References

Sources

External links

 (Kindle, EPUB and txt files)
1947 Theatre Guild on the Air radio adaptation at Internet Archive
 
: performance history, cast lists, awards received
Importance of being Earnest at Tech Rigid
Printable version in PDF format, A4 paper size
The Importance of Being Earnest early manuscript draft at the British Library

The Importance of Being Earnest, Victoria and Albert Museum

1895 plays
Plays by Oscar Wilde
Comedy plays
Irish plays adapted into films